The 2006 FIA GT Motor City GT 500 was the final race for the 2006 FIA GT Championship season.  It took place on November 18, 2006.

Official results
Class winners in bold.  Cars failing to complete 70% of winner's distance marked as Not Classified (NC).

Statistics
 Pole Position – #3 Larbre Competition – 1:55.987
 Average Speed – 158.4 km/h

External links

 Official Results

D